The Noi River is a river in Thailand.

Geography
The Noi River is a distributary of the Chao Phraya River. It originates at the Chao Phraya Dam at Chai Nat and rejoins the Chao Phraya at Bang Sai.

History
The Noi River was the site of the original Mueang Wiset Chai Chan, the location of a historic Burmese encampment en route to the Battle at Bang Rachan.

References

Rivers of Thailand